Troon railway station was a railway station serving the town of Troon, South Ayrshire, Scotland. Located at Troon Harbour, this was the first railway station in the town and was part of the Kilmarnock and Troon Railway.

History 
The station was opened on 6 July 1812. The Glasgow, Paisley, Kilmarnock and Ayr Railway took over management of the station on 16 July 1846, however the station closed just days later on 20 July 1846.

References

Notes

Sources 
 
 

Disused railway stations in South Ayrshire
Railway stations in Great Britain opened in 1812
Railway stations in Great Britain closed in 1846
Troon